"Talking to Myself" is a song by American rock band Linkin Park. The song is the second single from their seventh studio album, One More Light and was released on July 25, 2017. The music video was released on July 20, 2017, the same day that Linkin Park's lead vocalist, Chester Bennington, was found dead by suicide. It is Chester Bennington's first posthumously released single.

Music video

The music video, which features footage of the band performing at various places and rehearsing, was edited and directed by Mark Fiore. It was released several hours before Chester Bennington was confirmed dead. 

The music video reached over 10.1 million views on YouTube in one day, making it one of the most viewed online video in the first 24 hours. The official video uploaded to Linkin Park's YouTube channel on July 20, 2017 was shorter than the previously released audio-only video and the video released to other sites such as Vevo; it was later fixed to play the full song, with the last shot being of Bennington in a vehicle looking out at a window. 

As of November 2021, the song has 140 million views on YouTube.

Critical reception
The song received mixed reviews from critics. Ian Gittins of The Guardian called it "a sleek Justin Bieber-style pop-R&B nugget". Allison Stewart of The Washington Post stated, "the electro-poppy 'Talking to Myself' sounds like the work of a '90s boy band". In a negative review, Anita Bhagwandas of NME commented that the song "is full of unsophisticated hooks and forgettable melodies". Jon Pareles of The New York Times described it as "a pounding plaint about loneliness, alienation and 'all the walls that you keep building.

Charts

Weekly charts

Year-end charts

References

2017 songs
Linkin Park songs
2017 singles
Warner Records singles
Songs written by Mike Shinoda
Songs written by Brad Delson
American pop rock songs
Songs written by Ilsey Juber
Songs written by J. R. Rotem

Electronic rock songs
Electropop songs